Bennetland is a hamlet in the East Riding of Yorkshire, England.

Bennetland lies between the Selby Line and the Hull and Doncaster Branch and is served by Gilberdyke railway station.

The hamlet forms part of the civil parish of Gilberdyke.

Villages in the East Riding of Yorkshire